Patricia Wright may refer to:
 Patricia Wright (primatologist)
 Patricia Wright (actress)

See also
 Patrisha Wright, American disabilities activist
 Pat Wright (disambiguation)